Flame Towers is a group of three skyscrapers in Baku, Azerbaijan. The three flame-shaped towers are intended to symbolize the elements of fire, and are a reference to Azerbaijan's nickname "The Land of Fire", historically rooted in a region where natural gas flares emit from the ground and Zoroastrian worshippers considered flames to be a symbol of the divine (notably at the Ateshgah of Baku and Yanar Dag). A three-flame motif also appears on the coat of arms of Baku. The three buildings (South, East and West) consist of 130 residential apartments over 33 floors, a Fairmont hotel tower that consists of 250 rooms and 61 serviced apartments, and office blocks that provides a net 33,114 square meters of office space. In June 2014 Lamborghini opened its first branch in Azerbaijan, located on the ground floor of the East tower of the Flame Towers.

Construction
The cost of Flame Towers was an estimated US$350 million. Construction began in 2007, with completion in 2012. HOK was the architect for the project, DIA Holdings served as the design-build contractor, and Hill International provided project management. A peer-reviewed publication in 2020 noted that the Flame Towers "...are something of a Potemkin edifice in that one of the towers houses a Fairmont Hotel while the other two are unoccupied."

Illumination 
The Flame Towers are completely covered with the LED screens that display the movement of a fire visible from the farthest points of the city. The facades of the three Flame Towers function as large display screens with the use of more than 10,000 high-power LED luminaires, supplied by the Osram subsidiary Traxon Technologies and Vetas Electric Lighting. The light show transitions from giant flames, the colours of the Azerbaijani flag, a figure waving a flag, and giant tanks of water being filled. Transition times are approximately 2 minutes.

In culture 
The buildings are featured in Extreme Engineering, a documentary television series that airs on the Discovery Channel and the Science Channel. The episode called "Azerbaijan's Amazing Transformation" was broadcast on 22 April 2011 as part of Season 9.

The Flame Towers also appeared prominently in trailers before many entries for the Eurovision Song Contest 2012 hosted in Baku (and, in the next 4 years, with the pre song trailer based in the singer's home area, features in the trailer before the Azerbaijan song).

The towers are also a prominent landmark in the video game Battlefield 4, with the first level of the single player campaign taking place in Baku. Additionally, the towers were shown frequently during coverage of the initial Formula One European Grand Prix held in Baku.

Criticism 
A peer-reviewed publication in 2020 noted that the Flame Towers "...are something of a Potemkin edifice in that one of the towers houses a Fairmont Hotel while the other two are unoccupied."

Gallery

References

External links

Buildings and structures in Baku
Skyscrapers in Azerbaijan
Hotel buildings completed in 2012
Office buildings completed in 2012
Residential buildings completed in 2012
Skyscraper hotels
Skyscraper office buildings
Residential skyscrapers
Retail buildings in Azerbaijan
HOK (firm) buildings
Fairmont Hotels and Resorts